The 2015 North Dakota State Bison football team represented North Dakota State University in the 2015 NCAA Division I FCS football season. They were led by second-year head coach Chris Klieman. The team, which played its 23rd season in the Fargodome, entered the season as the four-time defending national champions. The Bison have been members of the Missouri Valley Football Conference (MVFC) since the 2008 season.

The Bison went 13–2 on the season, won their fifth straight MVFC title, and their fifth consecutive NCAA Division I Football Championship, becoming the first-ever NCAA football team to win five straight championships at any level.  Yale won six straight college football national championships from 1879 to 1884, before the NCAA was formed.

Schedule

 Source:  (R) indicates record attendance.

Coaching staff

Roster

Recruiting class

Game summaries

At Montana

Weber State

North Dakota

At South Dakota State

Northern Iowa

South Dakota

At Indiana State

At Southern Illinois

Western Illinois

At Youngstown State

Missouri State

FCS playoffs

Second round – Montana

Quarterfinals–Northern Iowa

Semifinals–Richmond

Championship–Jacksonville State

Ranking movements

2016 NFL draftees

References

North Dakota State
North Dakota State Bison football seasons
NCAA Division I Football Champions
Missouri Valley Football Conference champion seasons
North Dakota State
North Dakota State Bison football